Touch rugby was introduced to the Pacific Games in 2003 at Suva in Fiji. It is an optional sport for the Pacific Games program, and the tournaments include men's, women's and mixed competitions. The first touch rugby tournament at the  Pacific Mini Games was played in the Cook Islands in 2009.

Pacific Games

Medal table

Men's tournament

Women's tournament

Mixed tournament

Pacific Mini Games

Men's

Women's

Mixed

References

 
Pacific Games